The opening ceremony of the 2004 Summer Olympics was held on August 13, 2004 starting at 20:45 EEST (UTC+3)  at the Olympic Stadium in Marousi, Greece, a suburb of Athens. As mandated by the Olympic Charter, the proceedings combined the formal and ceremonial opening of this international sporting event, including welcoming speeches, hoisting of the flags and the parade of athletes, with an artistic spectacle to showcase the host nation's culture and history. 72,000 spectators (with nearly 50 world leaders) attended the event, with approximately 15,000 athletes from 202 countries participating in the ceremony as well. It marked the first-ever international broadcast of high-definition television, undertaken by the U.S. broadcaster NBC and the Japanese broadcaster NHK.
The Games were officially opened by President of the Hellenic Republic Konstantinos Stephanopoulos at 23:46 EEST (UTC+3).

Proceedings

Countdown and Welcome
The opening ceremony began with a 28-second countdown—one second per Olympics held since Athens last hosted the first modern games, paced by the sounds of an amplified heartbeat. At the end of the countdown, fireworks are then set off. 

400 percussionists perform the zeimbekiko before walking around the stadium ground. A 50-person strong bouzouki band also performs. It is led by two drummers, one inside the stadium, and one projected on the stadium screen from the ancient stadium of Olympia, the locale of the Olympic games of antiquity. A blazing comet, seemingly coming from the ancient stadium of Olympia on the screen was Petros Kourtis, the drummer who appeared on the big screen of the Olympic Stadium. Nikos Hatzidavitidis, the drummer playing for Petros, and lands on the flooded stadium drawing with its fire the Olympic Rings. The comet symbolizes the fire of the ancients giving life to the modern Olympic movement, thus bridging the past and the present together. According to Dimitris Papaioannou, the event "was a pageant of traditional Greek culture and history harkening back to its mythological beginnings, and viewed through the progression of Greek art." 

Next, a young Greek boy Michalis Patsatzis sailed into the stadium on a giant paper boat waving the host nation's flag, symbolizing Greece's maritime tradition and its close connection to the sea. The Hellenic Naval Band then walks into the stadium. The President of the Athens Organizing Committee for the Olympic Games (ATHOC), Gianna Angelopoulos-Daskalaki, and President of the International Olympic Committee Jacques Rogge walk onto the stadium floor. The Band then performs the Presidential fanfare, where President of the Hellenic Republic Konstantinos Stephanopoulos then also arrives on the stadium floor. The three presidents meet the young boy, before Hymn to Liberty, the Greek national anthem was performed a cappella with the raising of the Greek Flag.

Artistic section
The segments that followed were divided in two main parts. The first part of the main artistic segment of the opening ceremony was called "Allegory." "Allegory" introduced the main conceptual themes and ideals that are going to be omnipresent throughout the entire opening ceremony, such as the confluence of the past and present, love and passion as the progenitors of history, and humanity's attempt to understand itself. The second part, called the "Clepsydra," or "Hourglass," celebrates the themes introduced in the "Allegory" section through a portrayal of Greek history from the ancient to the modern times.

Allegory
The "Allegory" segment began with a recitation of a verse from Nobel Prize-winning Greek poet George Seferis' poem "Mythistorema 3." As the verse is being recited on the speakers, the spotlights are focused upon a woman clad in a black gown looking out to the water. Holding a marble sculpture head, the woman seems to be entering into a dream. As she looks into the dark water, a centaur appears whose human and animal parts supposedly symbolize the duality of spirit and body. The centaur then walks about and then throws a spear of light into the center of the stadium, from which a giant statue that exemplified Cycladic art (and thus one of the first depictions of the human form in Greek art) emerged. This Cycladic head also represents one of the first attempts of humanity to understand itself. With the use of lasers, geometrical shapes and other scientific images (such as a stylistic representation of the Solar System) were displayed on the figure's face. The statue then broke into pieces that floated away, and from within it emerged a smaller kouros statue from the Archaic Period of Greek sculpture, which in turn broke apart to reveal the depiction of man in a sculpture of the classical period, symbolizing the dawn of individuality and extolling human scale, one of the principal themes of the 2004 Olympics. At the end of this sequence, a cube arises from the water, and a man starts slowly balancing himself on the rotating cube while representations of human kind's greatest achievements, contrasted to humanistic representations and images of men, women, and children of various ethnicities and ages, are projected onto the pieces of broken sculpture, which seem to be floating above the water. This last sequence is meant to symbolize the birth of logical thought, higher learning, and humanity finally making sense of the world in which it lives. After this sequence, the pieces of sculpture descend to the water, meant to symbolize the Greek isles.

Clepsydra

In the next sequence, Eros, the Greek god of love, was introduced flying over a pair of lovers frolicking in the pool of water located in the center of the stadium. The young couple along with Eros symbolize the fact that the humanity which create and shape history is born out of love and passion. This segment introduces the next part of the ceremony, the "Clepsydra," which highlights the themes of the opening ceremony through a celebration of Greek history. The lovers then lie down in the water, and both fall into a dream state. Throughout the rest of the scenes from history and mythology, Eros flew over the parade, occasionally touching or stepping on the floats moving beneath him, thus reinforcing the theme of love and passion as the source for all history.

The pageantry following the statues and the introduction of Eros continued to portray scenes that showed the sequence of Greek civilisation through its art. The scenes started with the Minoan civilisation. The first float featured the iconic image of Minoan civilization: that of the fertility goddess clad in a bodice exposing her breasts and clutching serpents in both hands. The subsequent floats then featured scenes of bull-jumping, dolphins, and other elements that harkened back to the images in the frescoes of Phaestos. The scenes then proceeded to the more stark art of the Mycenean civilisation, followed by representations of the Classical period. A chariot carrying an actor portraying Alexander the Great introduced images from the Hellenistic period, which in turn were followed by representations of Byzantine art, the Greek War of Independence, and lastly of 20th century elements of Greek culture, such as the popular shadow-theatre figure Karagiozis, who is said to be a humorous and self-deprecating depiction (and parody) of Greek mentality.

At the end of the parade, "Eros" lowered enough to help a pregnant woman remove her outer garment. This last part represents the ceremony coming into full circle: the "Clepsydra" segment began with the image of the Minoan fertility goddess and is now ending with a pregnant woman representing the future of all humanity and history. With belly glowing, the woman moved into the lake of water as the stadium's lights dimmed and lights underneath the pool of water were turned on, thus creating an image of stars in a galaxy. According to Greek myth, the stars of the galaxy were born out of the milk of Hera's fertile breasts. In fact, the name for the Milky Way Galaxy, the home to planet Earth, was born out of this myth. Slowly the stars rose around the woman, and moved to form a rapidly rotating DNA double helix, which is the basis for all life on the planet. Humanity's attempt to understand itself, a theme that has been omnipresent throughout the entire ceremony beginning with the Cycladic head, is further reinforced by the representation of the DNA double helix, which symbolizes humanity's latest and most recent attempt to understand itself: the late 20th and early 21st centuries witnessed great advances in the field of genetics with the mapping of the human genome.

Finally, all the characters of the parade began to walk inside the pool, around its center, mixing the past and the present in a single marching beat of the drums. The confluence of the past and the present is another main theme of the opening ceremony. The music began a crescendo with choruses, when all of a sudden an olive tree was lifted from the center of the pool—symbolizing goddess Athena's preferred gift by the Greeks—land and food—over Poseidon's gift, the horse—a tool of warfare. At the music's climax, all the characters stopped and raised their arms as if worshipping the Tree, which was high above, surrounded also by the fragments of the deconstructed statues who resembled a mount.

Attending heads of state and heads of government
The ceremony was attended by delegates from 90 countries, which included : 3 kings, 4 princes, 29 presidents and 26 premiers. They included :
 
International organizations:
 President of the United Nations General Assembly Julian Hunte, President of Kosovo Ibrahim Rugova
 Director General of UNESCO Koichiro Matsuura
 President of the European Commission Romano Prodi
 Secretary General of Francophonie Boutros Boutros-Ghali
 Secretary General of CIS Vladimir Rushailo
 Secretary General of NATO Jaap de Hoop Scheffer 
 President of the IOC Jacques Rogge and wife Anne Rogge, IOC Vice Presidents Thomas Bach and wife Claudia Bach, James L. Easton and wife Phyllis Easton, and Vitali Smirnov, IOC Member Sergey Bubka and wife Lilia Tutunik, predecessor Juan Antonio Samaranch and Members of the International Olympic Committee
 
Host nation:
 President of the Hellenic Republic Konstantinos Stephanopoulos, President's Adjutant Hellenic Air Force Colonel Georgios Dritsakos, Prime Minister of Greece Kostas Karamanlis, wife Natasa Pazaïti, Ex-Prime Minister of Greece Costas Simitis, President of the Panhellenic Socialist Movement and Leader of the Opposition George Papandreou, Speaker of Parliament Anna Benaki-Psarouda, ATHOC President Gianna Angelopoulos-Daskalaki, husband Theodore Angelopoulos, Mayor Dora Bakoyannis, Minister of Public Order and Citizen Protection of Greece Georgios Voulgarakis and the entire Cabinet of Greece
 Former King of the Hellenes Constantine II, wife Former Queen consort of the Hellenes Anne-Marie of Greece, children Princess Alexia with her husband Carlos Morales Quintana and Princess Theodora and Prince Phillipos
 
Foreign dignitaries:
 Prime Minister of Saint Lucia Kenny Anthony, wife Rose-Marie Belle Antoine
 Captain Regent of San Marino Marino Riccardi and Paolo Bollini
 Prime Minister of Angola Fernando da Piedade Dias dos Santos, wife Maria Tomé Dias dos Santos
 President of Azerbaijan Ilham Aliyev and wife Mehriban Aliyeva
 President of Egypt Hosni Mubarak
 Prime Minister of Albania Fatos Nano, wife Xhoana Nano
 Prime Minister of Andorra Marc Forné Molné
 President of Armenia Robert Kocharyan
 Prime Minister of Australia John Howard
 Chancellor of Austria Wolfgang Schüssel
 Prime Minister of Vanuatu Ham Lin̄i
 King of Belgium Albert II, Prince Philippe, Queen Paola, Princess Mathilde, and Prime Minister of Belgium Guy Verhofstadt
 Prime Minister of Bosnia and Herzegovina Adnan Terzic
 Prime Minister of Bulgaria Simeon Saxe-Coburg-Gotha and wife Margarita Saxe-Coburg-Gotha
 President of Brazil Luiz Inácio Lula da Silva
 Premier of the Virgin Islands Orlando Smith
 President of France Jacques Chirac
 President of Germany Horst Köhler, wife Eva Köhler
 President of Georgia Mikhail Saakashvili
 President of Gabon Omar Bongo
 Governor of Guam Felix Camacho
 Crown Prince of Denmark Frederik, Crown Princess Mary and Prime Minister Anders Fogh Rasmussen
 Chancellor of Switzerland Pascal Couchepin, Defense Minister Samuel Schmid and former President Adolf Ogi
 President of Estonia Arnold Ruutel
 Former President of the United States of America George H. W. Bush, former First Lady of the United States Barbara Bush, daughters Jenna Bush and Barbara Pierce Bush, Former U.S. Tennis Champion Chris Evert, U.S. Ambassador to Greece Thomas Miller, Archbishop Demetrios of America, and Owner and Chairman of A.G. Spanos Companies Alex Spanos and Faye Spanos
 Deputy Prime Minister of Japan Yasuo Fukuda
 King of Jordan Abdullah II and Queen Rania
 Prime Minister of Ireland Bertie Ahern
 President of Iceland Olafur Ragnar Grimsson
 Queen Sofia of Spain, daughters Infanta Elena, Duchess of Lugo and Infanta Cristina of Spain and her husband Iñaki Urdangarin 
 Vice President of Israel Shimon Peres
 President of Italy Carlo Azeglio Ciampi
 President of Kazakhstan Nursultan Nazarbayev
 Foreign Minister of Canada Lloyd Axworthy
 Foreign Minister of China Li Zhaoxing
 Prime Minister of Kyrgyzstan Nikolai Tanayev
 President of South Korea Roh Moo-hyun
 President of Cook Islands Christopher Loeak
 President of Croatia Stjepan Mesić
 President of Cyprus Tassos Papadopoulos and President of the House of Representatives Demetris Christofias
 Deputy Prime Minister of Lesotho Tom Thabane
 President of Latvia Vaira-Vike Freiberga
 President of Belarus Aleksander Lukashenko
 Deputy Prime Minister of Lebanon Saad Hariri
 First Lady of Libya Fatiha al-Nuri
 Prime Minister of Lithuania Algirdas Brazauskas
 Prime Minister of Liechtenstein Otmar Hasler
 Grand Duke of Luxembourg Henri
 President of Malta Edward Fenech Adami
 Prime Minister of the United Kingdom Tony Blair, wife Cherie Blair, and Anne, Princess Royal
 President of Micronesia Manny Mori
 President of Moldova Vladimir Voronin
 Sovereign Prince of Monaco Albert
 Prime Minister of New Zealand Helen Clark
 Crown Prince of Norway Haakon and Prime Minister of Norway Kjell Magne Bondevik
 First Lady of South Africa Zanele Mbeki
 Prince Willem-Alexander of the Netherlands and Prime Minister of the Netherlands Jan Peter Balkenende
 President of Hungary Ferenc Mádl
 President of Uzbekistan Islam Karimov
 Prime Minister of Ukraine Viktor Yanukovych
 President of Palestine Mahmood Abbas
 President of Poland Aleksander Kwaśniewski and wife Jolanta Kwaśniewska
 President of Portugal Jorge Sampaio
 Prime Minister of Macedonia Hari Kostov
 President of Rwanda Paul Kagame
 President of Romania Ion Iliescu
 President of Russia Vladimir Putin
 Vice President of Senegal Macky Sall
 President of Serbia and Montenegro Svetozar Marovic
 President of Serbia Boris Tadic
 President of Montenegro Filip Vujanovic
 President of Slovakia Ivan Gašparovič
 President of Slovenia Janez Drnovsek
 Prime Minister of Solomon Islands Allan Kemakeza
 President of Sudan Omar al-Bashir
 King of Sweden Carl XVI Gustaf, Queen Silvia and Prime Minister Goran Persson
 Crown Prince of Tonga Tupoutoʻa
 President of Togo Gnassingbe Eyadema
 Prime Minister of Turkey Recep Tayyip Erdogan and First Lady Emine Erdogan
 President of Tajikistan Emomali Rahmon
 President of Turkmenistan Saparmurat Niyazov
 President of the Czech Republic Vaclav Klaus
 President of Finland Tarja Halonen

Parade of Nations

In order to prepare for the entry of the athletes to the stadium, the giant pool of water that had been constructed on the floor of the stadium had to first be drained. 2,162,000 liters of water were drained from the stadium in a time period of three minutes, providing a dry, hard surface for the athletes to march and gather on.

Typically, Greece leads the Parade of Nations in any Olympics, with the host nation entering the stadium last. However, since Greece was the host nation, they went last, sending only their flag with the weightlifter Pyrros Dimas as the flag bearer into the stadium at the beginning of the parade, and the athletes themselves at the end of it.

The debut position was given to Saint Lucia (Αγία Λουκία in Greek), who led the Parade of Nations into the stadium. As the nations entered in Greek alphabetical order, Zimbabwe—which has usually been the penultimate nation, followed only by the host country—appeared in the middle of the parade.  Countries such as the United States and Switzerland, which are usually at the rear of the pack, were granted earlier entries as well due to their position in the Greek alphabet.

The entrances of Afghanistan and Iraq were emotional highpoints of the parade. The nation of Kiribati made its debut Olympic appearance at the 2004 Summer Olympics, and East Timor marched under its own flag for the first time. Serbia and Montenegro appeared at the Olympics under the nation's new name for the first and only time since the country was officially renamed in 2003, and prior to the union's dissolution in 2006 (just before the 2008 Summer Olympics); it had previously been known as Yugoslavia.

Due to the unpopularity of the American-led invasion of Iraq among Greeks, it had been expected by the media that audience members would protest against the war during the entrance of the American delegation into the stadium by booing; however, the Americans did receive a warm welcome, much to the pleasant surprise of US news anchors covering the event as well as NBC Sports anchor Bob Costas.

Apart from Greece, the Greek crowd reserved some of their loudest cheers for their fellow Greeks from Cyprus, Australia, home to many Greeks and site of the previous Summer Olympics and Mediterranean countries such as France and Italy, as well as for Brazil and Canada. A loud cheer was also given for Djibouti, because it had only one person enter the stadium. The teams from Palestine and Serbia and Montenegro were also very warmly welcomed. Cheers greeted Portugal, the nation that hosted the UEFA Euro 2004, which Greece won beating Portugal in the final match by 1–0.

High-ranking politicians and royalty from all around the world applauded as the teams from their respective countries paraded by. Important guests like U.K. Prime Minister Tony Blair, Italian President Carlo Azeglio Ciampi, Crown Prince Haakon of Norway (who lit the Cauldron for the 1994 Winter Olympics), and Crown Prince Frederik of Denmark, (among others) each stood and applauded the teams from their countries. Past world leaders, including U.S. President George H. W. Bush, also attended and applauded their national teams during the parade, in which DJ Tiësto played trance music.

Oceania - A Song for the Athletes
Björk then sang her song Oceania. The song was written at the ocean's point of view, from which the singer believes all life emerged, and details the human's evolution, whilst accompanied by a choir. While she sang, her dress slowly covered the athletes with a white sheet. At the end of the song, a projection of the world was shown on the dress. However, technical complications with the sheet meant that the sheet didn't reach all the athletes by the end of the song. If the segment succeeded, it would be a call back to the flags covering all athletes in the Olympic opening ceremonies of 1992 and 2000.

A video from the International Space Station Expedition 9 crew then played, with Russian Commander Gennady Padalka and United States Flight Engineer Michael Fincke welcoming the athletes and stressing the importance for human collaboration between countries for peace.

108 Years of Olympic Games
After introducing the founders of the Modern Olympic Games, Pierre de Coubertin and Demetrios Vikelas and the first games in 1896, runner Giorgos Sabanis carries a flag with an image of an olive branch symbolizing not only peace but Athens itself, lapped around the stadium, symbolically crossing tape dedicated to the previous 27 Olympiads. The runner symbolically stumbles at the 1916, 1940, and 1944 Games which were canceled due to world wars. The runner ended his run at the very center of the stadium, where the olive tree from the artistic section has appeared, symbolizing the Modern Olympic Games journey around the world, and coming back home to Athens. 

While not officially part of the Olympic protocol, there has been a recognition of past host cities at some Opening Ceremonies. For the Summer Olympics, a recognition has appeared in the 1992 opening ceremony in Barcelona, 1996 opening ceremony in Atlanta and a reduced version at the 2012 opening ceremony in London. In the Winter Olympics, there has been a recognition in 2002 Winter Olympics in Salt Lake City, where banners of the previous 18 Winter Olympics entered Rice-Eccles Stadium at the beginning of the ceremony, and the opening ceremonies of the 2010 Winter Olympics in Vancouver.

Opening addresses
Two short speeches were delivered in front of the olive tree, a traditional Greek and Olympic symbol. The first speech came from Gianna Angelopoulos-Daskalaki, the President of the Athens Organizing Committee for the Olympic Games (ATHOC), and the first female chief organizer of an Olympic Games. Angelopoulos-Daskalaki offered a message of welcome to the Athletes of the World in Greek and English: "Καλως ΗΡΘΑΤΕ"! and "Welcome! Welcome to the Games of the XXVIII Olympiad. Welcome to a unique Olympic Homecoming."  She told the athletes in Greek: "Η Ελλάδα είναι εδώ. Είμαστε έτοιμοι." which translates into English as "Greece is here. We're ready" and also stated, "Ολυμπιακοί Αγώνες, Καλώς ήρθατε." (in Greek), "Jeux olympiques, bienvenue." (in French), and "Olympic Games, Welcome home!" (in English). She also stated the people of Greece "have waited long for this moment," alluding to the long period between the first modern Olympic Games in Greece and the 2004 Games.

Angelopoulos-Daskalaki was followed by the President of the International Olympic Committee (IOC) Jacques Rogge, who delivered a speech encouraging participating athletes to resist the urge to use banned performance-enhancing substances and "show us that sport unites by overriding national, political, religious, and language barriers". Rogge speaking in Greek stated, "Έχω τώρα την τιμή να καλέσω τον Πρόεδρο της Ελληνικής Δημοκρατίας. Να κηρύξει την Έναρξη των Αγώνων." which translate into English as "I have the honor of inviting the President of the Hellenic Republic. To announce the opening of the Games." Rogge then introduced the President of the Hellenic Republic Konstantinos Stephanopoulos, who declared the games officially open. Stephanopoulos was accompanied by Colonel Georgios Dritsakos, the President's Adjutant of the Hellenic Air Force, who spoke in Greek saying, "Κηρύσσω την έναρξη των Ολυμπιακών Αγώνων της Αθήνας...και τον εορτασμό της 28ης Ολυμπιάδος της σύγχρονης εποχής." which translates into English as "I declare open the Olympic Games of Athens...and the celebration of the XXVIII Olympiad of the modern era."

The Olympic Flag, Anthem and Oaths
Five bells, each bell representing a continent, then are rung to heralded in the opening the games. The audience also rang their bells given to them. As the bells were rung, children run into the stadium floor holding olive branches. In the midst of their crowd, the Olympic flag made its entrance. It was carried in by eight Greek athletes. They were: 
 Petros Galaktopoulos (Greco-Roman wrestling) 
 Ilias Hatzipavlis (sailing)
 Niki Bakoyianni (athletics)
 Angelos Basinas (football) 
 Leonidas Kokas (weightlifting)
 Michalis Mouroutsos (taekwondo) 
 Valerios Leonidis (weightlifting) 
 Dimosthenis Tampakos (gymnastics) 
They then passed on the flag to the eight sailors of the Hellenic Navy.
Then the Olympic flag was hoist and raised while singing of the Olympic Hymn which the Greek choirs sang in Greek was conducted by John Psathas.

Greek freestyle swimmer Zoi Dimoschaki gave the Athletes Oath on behalf of all athletes in Greek. Greek basketball referee Lazaros Voreadis delivered the officials oath in Greek.

Torch relay and the lighting of the cauldron

The Opening Ceremony culminated at the end of the torch relay, a tradition began when Berlin hosted the games in 1936. This segment preceding the torch's arrival honored the first global torch relay that was begun in Athens. Before the torch came into the stadium, three rings arose from the center of the stadium that simulated a globe. Projections of doves were shown on the globe and on the LED screens as symbol of peace. Then actors, suspended on cables, started rising out of the crowd and ran towards the globe, carrying glowing sticks meant to simulate the Olympic torch. On the globe, the names of the cities which the torch visited were projected, and this segment ended with all the torchbearers floating mid-air coming together at the globe. After this segment ended, the lights were dimmed, and the sound of the heartbeat accompanied by thunderous cheers and applause met the torch's final arrival to the Olympic Stadium.

Torch bearer Nikos Galis, considered to be the greatest Greek basketball player of all time, entered the stadium first. The torch was passed on, in sequential order, to Greek football legend Mimis Domazos, 1992 Hurdles champion Voula Patoulidou, 1996 Olympic weightlifting champion Kakhi Kakhiashvili, and 1996 Olympic gymnastics champion Ioannis Melissanidis.

The torch was finally passed to the 1996 Olympic sailing champion Nikolaos Kaklamanakis, who lit a giant tapered column resembling the Olympic torch — not, as usual, a cauldron — to burn during the duration of the 2004 Summer Olympics. As Kaklamanakis ascended the steps to light the cauldron, the cauldron seemed to bow down to him, symbolizing that despite advance of technology, technology is still a creation and tool of humanity and that it was meant to serve humanity's needs. The ceremony concluded with a breathtaking fireworks display.

Music performances

During the "Allegory" segment highlighting the conceptual and themes and ideals of the opening ceremony, the chosen music was Gustav Mahler's Symphony No. 3 in D Minor: 6. Langsam.
The music played during the "Clepsydra" segment highlighting Greek history and mythology was composed by Konstantinos Bita. The songs played were instrumental in nature and many used traditional Greek instruments. Famous Greek artists such as Stavros Xarhakos (whose song "Zeimbekiko" was played), Manos Hadjidakis, Mikis Theodorakis and Konstantinos Bita, were included in the Olympic soundtrack. The whole music project was arranged by composer George Koumendakis, who had worked in the past several times with Papaioannou and was assisted in this project by Maria Metaxaki. The music production team included Marcus Dillistone, Paul Stefanidis, Dick Lewsey and Julian Scott.

New Zealand composer John Psathas (son of Greek immigrant parents) was chosen to compose and arrange music to accompany parts of the opening ceremonies. The most prestigious engagement of his career to date, he joins the ranks of well-known composers, such as John Williams, Ryuichi Sakamoto, Leonard Bernstein and Mikis Theodorakis who have also written music for the Olympics.

Mr Psathas was engaged in 2003 to compose and arrange music for the Games’ opening and closing ceremonies. He has since commuted several times between Wellington and Athens to work on the music and supervise the rehearsal process.

His music includes a number of specially composed fanfares and processionals to accompany the arrival of the IOC President, the lighting of the Olympic cauldron and to precede the Olympic oaths, and he is responsible for the soundtrack to the entire ‘flame sequence’ of the ceremony. John Psathas has also arranged the National Anthem of Greece, the Olympic Hymn, and music by Shostakovich, Debussy and the foremost living Greek composer Mikis Theodorakis to accompany other parts of the ceremony. The fireworks at the Games’ closing ceremony on 29 August will also feature music by the composer.

During the Parade of Nations, Dutchman DJ Tiësto provided the music, becoming the first DJ ever to spin live at the Olympics. During the course of his performance the Dutch athletes started dancing in front of the DJ booth and had to be moved on by officials. Tiësto later released a condensed version of the performance on CD titled Parade of the Athletes. In the liner notes, he noted the IOC requested to him that the music not contain any lyrics as they could be inadvertently misinterpreted.

Björk performed "Oceania", later included on her album Medúlla, immediately after the Parade of Nations ended. While the song was being played, a large piece of fabric (which belonged to Björk's dress) was pulled over the heads of the athletes, who had gathered on the ground in the center of the stadium following their march around the stadium. At the conclusion of Björk's performance, a map of the world was projected on the fabric.

The entrance of the torch on the stadium was surrounded by the "Le Roi Lear Fanfarre", by Claude Debussy; and the cauldron was lighted by the final part of "Pirogov Suite", an epic suite by Dmitri Shostakovich. Both songs were adapted by John Psathas.

Anthems
 National Anthem of Greece
 Olympic Hymn (Greek)

Reviews
The ceremony was a source of major acclaim amongst international press and featured never before seen technologies used in a stadium, including a giant pool with slip-proof iridescent fiberglass flooring that drained its water in three minutes, beautiful and innovative lighting, and an ingenious staging system utilizing a complex network of automated cables that lifted, maneuvered, and choreographed the floating pieces of sculpture to follow the music and narrative of the opening ceremony. The costumes, which also drew great international praise, were designed by well-known London-based Greek fashion designer Sophia Kokosalaki. Eleftheria Deco was awarded for her lighting design of the opening ceremony with an Emmy award. NBC, an international television broadcaster of the 2004 Athens Olympics, has also been awarded with 6 Emmy Awards for its coverage of the Games and technical production.

References

Notes

External links

 Opening ceremony media guide : Games of the XXVIII Olympiad

Opening Ceremony
August 2004 sports events in Europe
Olympics opening ceremonies
Ceremonies in Greece
Marousi
Constantine II of Greece